Michael Richard Thurman (born July 22, 1973) is a former American professional baseball player who pitched in Major League Baseball (MLB) for the Montreal Expos from 1997 to 2001 and for the New York Yankees in 2002.

Thurman was drafted in the first round (31st overall) of the 1994 amateur draft, after playing for Oregon State University in college. He is a graduate of Philomath High School, where he made numerous contributions to the baseball program and has served as a coach there during a summer league. His records still stand at Philomath.

External links

 Baseball Almanac - Mike Thurman stats

1973 births
Living people
Albany Polecats players
American expatriate baseball players in Canada
Baseball players from Oregon
Columbus Clippers players
Harrisburg Senators players
Jupiter Hammerheads players
Major League Baseball pitchers
Montreal Expos players
New York Yankees players
New York Yankees scouts
Oregon State Beavers baseball players
Ottawa Lynx players
Sportspeople from Corvallis, Oregon
Vermont Expos players
West Palm Beach Expos players